Devulapalle  is a popular village situated in West Godavari district. The nearest railway station is Eluru located at a distance of more than 10 Km.

Demographics 

 Census of India, Devulapalle had a population of 2357. The total population constitute, 1185 males and 1172 females with a sex ratio of 989 females per 1000 males. 231 children are in the age group of 0–6 years, with sex ratio of 878. The average literacy rate stands at 66.04%.

References

Villages in West Godavari district